These are the singles that reached number one on the Top 100 Singles chart in 1992 as published by Cash Box magazine.

See also
1992 in music
List of Hot 100 number-one singles of 1992 (U.S.)

References
https://web.archive.org/web/20110818051756/http://cashboxmagazine.com/archives/90s_files/1992.html

1992
1992 record charts
1992 in American music